Kottai Mariamman is a 2001 Tamil-language Hindu devotional film written and directed by Rama Narayanan. The film featured Roja in the title role alongside Karan and Devayani. The film, which had music composed by Deva, released in December 2001. The film was dubbed in Telugu as Ammoru Thalli 2001, in Hindi as Durga Maiya 2002 And Jai Maa 2001, in Bhojpuri as Jai Maa 2006, and in Odia as Devi Shakti 2001. The film received positive reviews from critics.

Plot

The film is depicts the Story of Durga who is taken care  and raised by Kottai Mariamman. It also showcases how Mantramoorthi tries to Take Away Kottai Mariamman's Golden eye Petals which has divine powers. But is Defeated by Kottai Mariamman. He's been helped by Eshwar an atheist whose Wife Rajeshwari who is a great devotee of Kottai Mariamman.

Cast
Roja as Kottai Mariamman and Durga (Dual Role)
Karan as Eashwar
Devayani as Rajeswari
Vivek
Yuvarani
Senthil
Rami Reddy as Mantramoorthi
Nizhalgal Ravi
Vennira Aadai Moorthy
M. S. Bhaskar as Traffic Policeman
Srikala Paramasivam

Soundtrack
Lyrics written by Kalidasan and Snehan.
 Solla Poren - Deva
 Vellimalar Kannatha - Swarnalatha
 Sri Ranganatharukku - K. S. Chitra
 Morandu Pudikathe - Deva
 Sarpa Sarpamaai - Anuradha Sriram
 Sri Ranganatharukku (Bit Version) - Vaishali Unnikrishnan
 Amman Dance - Instrumental 
 Amman Dance - Instrumental

References

External links

2001 films
Hindu devotional films
2000s Tamil-language films
Films directed by Rama Narayanan
Mariamman
Films scored by Deva (composer)